Mytilinidae is a family of rotifers belonging to the order Ploima.

Genera:
 Lophocharis Ehrenberg, 1838
 Metopidia
 Mytilina Bory de St.Vincent, 1826
 Ploychaetus

References

Ploima
Rotifer families